Live in Concert 72/73 is a live DVD from Deep Purple, released in 2005. The DVD was certified Gold on August 3, 2007 by the RIAA, selling 50,000 copies in the US. It was recorded in KB Hallen in Copenhagen, Denmark in 1972, but not released until 1987 in Japan, under the title Machine Head Live 1972, and in Europe three years later under the title Scandinavian Nights (Live in Denmark 1972).

It is the only full concert filmed (in black and white) of the Mk II lineup in this era and features a rare live version of "Fireball". The DVD release also features three tracks from 1973, filmed during a US concert in New York City at Hofstra University in Hempstead, Long Island, in colour. It features the only known official 1970's video recording of "Smoke on the Water", performed by the Mark II lineup, aside from some recovered footage of it being performed in Tokyo on August 17, 1972, which was later released to the public on May 16, 2016.

Copenhagen - March 1972

All songs written by Ritchie Blackmore, Ian Gillan, Roger Glover, Jon Lord and Ian Paice except where indicated.

"Highway Star" - 7:27
"Strange Kind of Woman" - 9:09
"Child in Time" - 17:27
"The Mule" - 9:20
"Lazy" - 11:06
"Space Truckin'" - 24:44
"Fireball" - 4:04
"Lucille" (Al Collins, Richard Penniman) - 6:25
"Black Night" - 6:29

New York - May 1973
"Strange Kind of Woman" - 6:18
"Smoke on the Water" - 5:20
"Space Truckin'" - 10:43

Bonus Track
California Jam 1974 Bonus Vision
"Burn" (Blackmore, Lord, Paice, David Coverdale) - 7:31

Personnel
Ritchie Blackmore: guitar
Ian Gillan: vocals, congas, maracas
Roger Glover: bass, tambourine on "Strange Kind Of Woman"
Jon Lord: organ, keyboards
Ian Paice: drums

Additional notes

 Live in Concert 72/73 is Vol. 1 in a series of DVD archive releases aimed to provide Deep Purple fans with DVDs rounding up as much rare footage from the 1968-1976 era as possible. Vol. 2 is Live in California 74 released at the end of 2005.
 A bit of swearing was cut out at the beginning of "Space Truckin'".

Certifications

References 

Deep Purple video albums
2005 live albums
2005 video albums
Live video albums
Deep Purple live albums